Venla may refer to:
Venla (given name)
Venla award, a Finnish TV award (1982-2010)
Golden Venla, a Finnish TV award (awarded since 2011)
Venlafaxine